ConTel Corporation (Continental Telephone) was the third largest independent phone company in the United States prior to the 1996 telecom deregulation. It was acquired by GTE in 1991.

History 
In 1980, Contel purchased Network Analysis Corp, then the largest information technology consulting company in the world. As a result of this purchase, future Internet Hall of Fame Pioneer Howard Frank served as president and CEO of Contel Information Systems, a subsidiary of Contel Corporation from 1969 until 1985.

Subsidiaries
Subsidiaries of Contel included:
Contel of the South (Georgia)
Contel of California (including lines in Arizona and Nevada)
ConTel of Illinois
ConTel of Indiana
Contel of Kentucky
Contel of Minnesota 
Contel of Missouri
Contel of New Hampshire
Contel of New York
Contel of North Carolina
Contel of the Northwest (Idaho, Oregon and Washington)
ConTel of Pennsylvania
ConTel Quaker State 
Contel of South Carolina
Contel of Vermont
Contel of Virginia 
Contel of the West (Arizona and Utah)

References

External links
ConTel's History in the West Indies
GTE Corporation's History

Verizon Communications
Telecommunications companies of the United States
Companies based in Atlanta
1991 mergers and acquisitions